Mršeča Vas is a settlement on the left bank of the Krka River in the Municipality of Šentjernej in southeastern Slovenia. The area is part of the traditional region of Lower Carniola. It is now included in the Southeast Slovenia Statistical Region.

A wooden bridge crosses the Krka River at the settlement.

References

External links
Mršeča Vas on Geopedia

Populated places in the Municipality of Šentjernej